Davy Rolando Bisslik (born 26 March 1982 in Savaneta, Aruba) is an Olympic swimmer from Aruba. He has swum for Aruba at the:
Olympics: 2000, 2004
World Championships: 2001, 2003
Pan American Games: 2003

Bisslik attended Colegio Arubano and later went to The College of New Jersey (TCNJ) to study computer science. In 2003, he swam for TCNJ, earning an All-American award in the 200-yard freestyle relay and six All-Conference awards. Bisslik was a member of the team that held TCNJ's record in the 200-yard medley relay.

References

Aruban male swimmers
Olympic swimmers of Aruba
Swimmers at the 2000 Summer Olympics
Swimmers at the 2004 Summer Olympics
Swimmers at the 2003 Pan American Games
Pan American Games competitors for Aruba
The College of New Jersey alumni
Living people
1982 births